The architecture of Telangana dates back over two thousand years.  The Indian state of Telangana is in the  Deccan plateau, bordering the coastal plain of Andhra Pradesh.   It has produced regional variants of wider styles of Indian architecture, both in Hindu temple architecture and Indo-Islamic architecture.

Buddhist architecture 
The Nelakondapalli stupa belongs to the Buddhist period.  It is located on the edge of the coastal plain.  ASI excavations in recent decades have found remains of a typical monastic complex, and a few works of art. The site seems to have remained active until the 6th century AD.

Hindu temple architecture

Chalukya 

The 7th-century Navabrahma Temples at Alampur were built by the Badami Chalukayas.

Kakatiya 
The Warangal Fort, Ramappa Temple, Kota Gullu and Thousand Pillar Temple are the best examples of Kakatiya architecture.

Indo-Islamic architecture

Golconda Sultanate 
The architecture of the Golconda Sultanate is very similar to that of other Deccan Sultanates. This Indo-Islamic style is unique to the states of Telangana, Andhra Pradesh, Karnataka and Maharashtra. The ruins of the Golconda Fort is the earliest example. They built elaborate tombs and mosques out of mortared stone.

The 16th-century Charminar, a centerpiece of Hyderabad, is a mosque with four minarets at four corners, elaborately decorated with stucco work. It stands at the confluence of four roads. It overlooks the Mecca Masjid, one of the largest mosques in India.

The Qutb Shahi tombs at Hyderabad contain the tombs of the sultans, other royals and important noblemen. Other examples include the Toli Mosque, Khairtabad Mosque and Taramati Baradari.

Colonial architecture 

During the British colonial period, Telangana was ruled by the Nizams of Hyderabad. The seat of the Nizam was Chowmahalla Palace, which showcases a wide variety of Indian and European styles.

Neoclassical
The British Residency and Falaknuma Palace in Hyderabad built in the neoclassical style is another great example of this period.

Art Deco
Art deco buildings in Hyderabad include the Monda Market and SBH Building.

Indo-Saracenic 
The High Court, City College, Osmania General Hospital and Kacheguda Railway Station in Hyderabad were designed by British architect Vincent Esch in the Indo-Saracenic style of architecture. The Moazzam Jahi market, although not designed by him, is clearly inspired from Esch's designs.

Post-Independence 
Building built in contemporary styles are common in the HITEC City and surrounding neighborhoods of Hyderabad. IIT Hyderabad is also designed in contemporary style by Christopher Benninger.

Gallery

References

Bibliography
 
 

Culture of Telangana
Telangana